Saori Oshima (大島沙緒里, born 14 November 1994), née Saori Adachi, is a Japanese mixed martial artist. She currently competes in the atomweight division of Jewels. She is the current Jewels atomweight champion and the current DEEP Microweight champion.

As of January 3, 2021, Oshima is ranked as the fourth best atomweight in the world by Fight Matrix and third best by Sherdog.

Background
Saori Oshima began training Judo when she was 3, and kept training it exclusively until she was 23. Oshima began training MMA at the age of 24.

Mixed martial arts career

Shooto
Oshima made her professional debut against Yuki Ono at Shooto 2020 1/26 on January 26, 2020, at the age of 25. She was originally scheduled to fight Zephania Ngaya, before Ngaya withdrew from the bout for undisclosed reasons. Oshima won the fight by a second-round technical knockout, stopping Ono with punches from the crucifix midway through the round.

In her second appearance with Shooto, Oshima faced the vastly more experienced Mina Kurobe at Shooto 2020 vol.3 on May 31, 2020. Kurobe won the fight by a third-round technical knockout.

DEEP and Jewels
Oshima was scheduled to face Sakura Mori at Deep Jewels 29 on July 23, 2020, in her promotional debut with Jewels. Oshima won the fight by a second round double-wristlock submission.

Oshima was scheduled to fight Mizuki Oshiro for the vacant DEEP Microweight title at DEEP 97 Impact on September 20, 2020. Oshima won the fight by a first-round scrafhold-armlock submission.

Returning to Jewels, Oshima was scheduled to face Si Woo Park at Deep Jewels 31 on December 19, 2020. Park won the closely contested bout by unanimous decision.

Jewels Atomweight Grand Prix
Oshima took part in the Jewels Atomweight Grand Prix, organized to crown the new champion, as the title was left vacant following Tomo Maesawa's retirement. She was scheduled to fight Emi Tomimatsu at Deep Jewels 32 on March 7, 2021. She won the quarterfinal bout by a first-round submission, locking in an armlock after just 45 seconds.

Oshima faced Si Woo Park at Deep Jewels 33 on June 19, 2021, in the semifinals of the grand prix. Both the semifinals and finals were scheduled to take place on the same night. She won the fight with Park by a first-round submission, locking in an armbar from the bottom after being knocked down. Oshima faced Hikaru Aono in the finals, and won by unanimous decision, with scores of 20-18, 20-18 and 20-17.

Deep and Jewels title reign
Oshima faced the two-time Rizin FF atomweight title challenger Kanna Asakura at Rizin 31 - Yokohama on October 24, 2021. She won the bout via split decision. Following this victory, Oshima was ranked as the third best atomweight in the world by Fight Matrix, and second best by Sherdog.

Oshima faced Namiko Kawabata in a Super Atomweight bout at Deep Jewels 36 on March 12, 2022. She lost the bout via unanimous decision.

Oshima made her first Jewels Atomweight title defense against Moeri Suda at Deep Jewels 37 on May 8, 2022. She won the fight by a first-round technical submission, forcing a referee stoppage with a kimura lock.

After successfully defending her Jewels atomweight title for the first time, Oshima was booked to face the one-time Rizin Super Atomweight Championship title challenger Miyuu Yamamoto at Rizin 36 on July 2, 2022. She won the fight by split decision.

Oshima made her first DEEP Microweight (97 lb) Championship defense against Mizuki Furuse at DEEP 110 on November 12, 2022. She won the fight by a first-round submission, forcing Furuse to tap to an americana just 84 seconds into the opening round.

Oshima faced Yerin Hong at Black Combat 5: Song of the Sword on February 4, 2023. She won the fight by a third-round submission, as she forced Hong to tap to an armbar 59 seconds into the final round.

Championships and accomplishments

Mixed martial arts
Shooto
18th Shooto Kantō Amateur Atomweight Championship
26th Shooto Kantō Amateur Atomweight Championship
DEEP
DEEP Microweight Championship (One time, current)
One successful title defense
Jewels
Jewels Atomweight Championship (One time, current)
One successful title defense

Judo
International Judo Federation
2009 World Cadets Championship Third Place
All Japan Judo Federation
2011 All Japan Selected Junior Judo Championship Runner-up (-44 kg)
2014 All Japan Selected Junior Judo Championship  (-44 kg)

Mixed martial arts record

 
|-
|Win
|align=center|11–3
|Ye Rin Hong
|Submission (armbar)
|Black Combat 5: Song of the Sword
|
|align=center|3
|align=center|0:59
|Incheon, South Korea
|
|-
|Win
|align=center| 10–3
|Mizuki Furuse
|Submission (scarf hold armlock)
|DEEP 110 Impact
|
|align=center|1
|align=center|1:24
|Tokyo, Japan 
|
|-
|Win
|align=center| 9–3
|Miyuu Yamamoto
|Decision (split)
|Rizin 36
|
|align=center|3
|align=center|5:00
|Okinawa, Japan
|
|-
| Win
| align=center| 8–3
| Moeri Suda
| Technical submission (kimura)
| Deep Jewels 37
| 
| align=center| 1
| align=center| 2:58
| Tokyo, Japan
| 
|-
| Loss
| align=center| 7–3
| Namiko Kawabata
| Decision (unanimous)
| Deep Jewels 36
| 
| align=center| 2
| align=center| 5:00
| Tokyo, Japan
| 
|-
| Win
| align=center| 7–2
|Kanna Asakura
|Decision (split)
|Rizin 31
|
|align=center|3
|align=center|5:00
|Yokohama, Japan
|
|-
| Win
| align=center| 6–2
| Hikaru Aono
| Decision (unanimous)
| Deep Jewels 33
| 
| align=center| 2
| align=center| 5:00
| Minato, Tokyo, Japan
| 
|-
| Win
| align=center| 5–2
| Si Woo Park
| Technical Submission (armbar)
| Deep Jewels 33
| 
| align=center| 1
| align=center| 2:28
| Minato, Tokyo, Japan
| 
|-
| Win
| align=center| 4–2
| Emi Tomimatsu
| Submission (kimura)
| Deep Jewels 32
| 
| align=center| 1
| align=center| 0:45
| Bunkyo, Tokyo, Japan
| 
|-
| Loss
| align=center| 3–2
| Si Woo Park
| Decision (unanimous)
| Deep Jewels 31
| 
| align=center| 3
| align=center| 5:00
| Shinjuku, Tokyo, Japan
| 
|-
| Win
| align=center| 3–1
| Mizuki Oshiro
| Submission (scarf hold armlock)
| Deep - 97 Impact
| 
| align=center| 1
| align=center| 2:09
| Tokyo, Japan
| 
|-
| Win
| align=center| 2–1
| Sakura Mori
| Technical Submission (kimura)
| Deep Jewels 29
| 
| align=center| 2
| align=center| 2:10
| Tokyo, Japan
| 
|-
| Loss
| align=center| 1–1
| Mina Kurobe
| TKO (punches)
| Shooto - Professional Shooto 2020 Vol. 3
| 
| align=center| 3
| align=center| 1:54
| Tokyo, Japan
|  
|-
| Win
| align=center| 1–0
| Yuki Ono
| TKO (punches)
| Shooto - Shooto 2020 in Korakuen Hall
| 
| align=center| 2
| align=center| 3:15
| Tokyo, Japan
| 
|-

|-
|Win
|align=center| 4–0
|Miku Nakamura 
|Decision (unanimous) 
|26th Shooto Kanto Amateur Championship
|
|align=center|2
|align=center|5:00
|Tokyo, Japan
|
|-
|Win
|align=center| 3–0
|Mana Yamashita 
|Submission (armlock) 
|26th Shooto Kanto Amateur Championship
|
|align=center|1
|align=center|1:46
|Tokyo, Japan
|
|-
|Win
|align=center| 2–0
|Haruna Kato 
|Submission (armlock) 
|26th Shooto Kanto Amateur Championship
|
|align=center|1
|align=center|
|Tokyo, Japan
|
|-
|Win
|align=center| 1–0
|Fumiko Sumi 
|Decision (unanimous) 
|19th Shooto Kanto Amateur Championship
|
|align=center|2
|align=center|5:00
|Tokyo, Japan
|
|-
|}

See also
 List of female mixed martial artists
 List of Deep champions
 List of current mixed martial arts champions

References

1994 births
Japanese female mixed martial artists
Living people
Atomweight mixed martial artists
Mixed martial artists utilizing judo
Japanese female judoka
Sportspeople from Shimane Prefecture
21st-century Japanese women